Pentaria is a genus of false flower beetles in the family Scraptiidae. There are about nine described species in Pentaria.

Species
These nine species belong to the genus Pentaria:
 Pentaria arabica Pankow, 1981 g
 Pentaria badia (Rosenhauer, 1847) g
 Pentaria bicolor (Liljeblad, 1918) i c g
 Pentaria decolor Champion, 1891 i c g
 Pentaria dispar (Liljeblad, 1918) i c g b
 Pentaria fuscula LeConte, 1862 i c g
 Pentaria hirsuta Smith, 1882 i c g
 Pentaria pallida (Liljeblad, 1918) i c g
 Pentaria trifasciata (Melsheimer, 1846) i c g b
Data sources: i = ITIS, c = Catalogue of Life, g = GBIF, b = Bugguide.net

References

Further reading

External links

 

Scraptiidae
Articles created by Qbugbot